Kiran Bala Bora (Assamese: কিৰণ বালা বড়া ; 1904 - 8 January 1993) was a freedom fighter and social activist from Assam, India. She is known for her participation in the civil disobedience movements of the 1930s and 1940s, which contributed to the independence of India.

Early life 
Kiran Bala Bora was born in 1904 in the village of North Haiborgaon in the Nagaon district of Assam to Kamal Chandra Pandit and Saroj Aidew. Kamal Chandra Pandit, her father, was a school teacher.  Kiran studied in school until the 3rd standard despite the opposition to sending women to school prevalent in Indian society at the time. At an early age, she was married to Saki Ram Laskar of Paroli Guri, Kampur, Nagaon. He died soon after they married. Kamal Chandra then brought Kiran back home along with Kiran's young daughter. During her teen years, she gained interest in the revolutionary movements of the country.

Contribution to India's Freedom Movement

The 1920s
The summer of 1920 saw the resurgence of the idea that India should gain independence from British rule, especially after the Jallianwala Bagh massacre. Led by Gandhi, hundreds of people participated in non-violent protests across India. Kiran started involving herself in the activities of the movement and gradually devoted all her time to it. She fundraised to help congress gain momentum in the northeastern part of India. She also worked alongside leaders like Purna Chandra Sharma, Mahidhar Bora, Haladhar Bhuyan, & D. K. Barooah. During this time, she met Chandraprava Saikiani, a writer, social reformer, and freedom fighter from Assam. Kiran established a close relationship with her and worked for social causes under her direction.

Kiran Bala Bora boycotted the use of foreign goods, one of the objectives of the non-cooperation movement. During one protest, she burnt valuable foreign goods from her own house. Instead of buying clothes manufactured in Europe, she started spinning cotton and making her own cloth. She also protested against the use of narcotic substances such as opium and bhang.

In 1929, the Lahore Congress resolved to celebrate 26 January 1930, as purna swaraaj (or Complete Independence) day. Accordingly, more than 400 women in Koliabor, led in part by Kiran Bala, joined in the celebrations, in defiance of the British-Indian government. Police stopped the women from participating, and many were allegedly beaten up.

The 1930s
Kiran was arrested by the British-Indian government for violation of laws several times. She fell severely ill on 7 February 1931 when she was in jail and was released after 4 months. In 1932, she was transferred to Shillong Jail, where she lived in dire conditions. 

During this time, Kiran met Ambika Kakati Aidew, another freedom fighter from Assam. Ambika's daughter, Jagyashini Kakati Aidew, had died and Ambika proposed that Kiran marry her son-in-law, Sanat Ram Bora. Kiran's father accepted Ambika's proposal and remarried his daughter while she was still involved in the freedom movement.

Sanat Ram Bora had five young children from his previous wife and lived in a joint family. Also, being the founder secretary of a newly established spiritual/religious Srimanta Sankaradeva Sangha (Sankardev Community). Kiran handled the responsibility of her joint family, including the children from Sanat's first marriage. She also served the devotees. Her husband granted her full independence and supported her in her political life.

In the 1930s, Gandhi had started the Civil Disobedience Movement to end the monopoly by British on salt. Kiran went door-to-door to explain the movement to the villagers of Polaxoni (the place where her spouse Sanat Ram Bora lived), gathering people and continuing her activities of collecting food and other relief items.

She preached about the country's independence to the devotees who came to attend the Sangha at her husband's house. She also spread awareness about the social problems related to women in India, like child marriage, Sati, education.

The 1940's 
Kiran became a mother of five more children during this time.

In 1942, the Quit India Movement was announced, and the British were asked to leave the country. "Do or Die" became the slogan of the movement. In response, the British colonial government initiated a crackdown on the movement, arresting tens of thousands of independence activists and keeping most of them imprisoned until 1945. 

Kiran Bora protested these events, bearing lathi charges and other actions by the police. She also went into hiding from the police. She fought till India was granted independence.

Post-independence 
India gained independence on 15 August 1947. Later in her life, Kiran tended to her children. 

She has been honoured with a freedom fighters pensions by both the state and central governments of India.

Kiran died on 8 January 1993. She remained an active Srimanta Sankaradeva Sangha worker and devotee until her death.

See also
 Indian independence movement
 List of Indian independence activists
 Srimanta Sankaradeva Sangha

References 

1904 births
1993 deaths
Indian independence activists from Assam
Revolutionary movement for Indian independence
Women Indian independence activists
Prisoners and detainees of British India
20th-century Indian women
20th-century Indian people